is a 1994 song recorded by Japanese singer Hiro Takahashi. The song comes from his second album called Welcome to Popsicle Channel. It reached number 9 on the Japanese charts.

This song also became the fourth ending of the anime series YuYu Hakusho.

Track listing

1994 release

Personnel
: piano, vocals, synthesizer
: electric guitar
: organ, synthesizer
: electric guitar 
: harmonica

Chart positions

Charts

Year-end charts

References

1994 singles
2005 singles
YuYu Hakusho
Anime songs
1994 songs
Songs written by Hiro Takahashi